Florida State College at Jacksonville (FSCJ) is a public college in Jacksonville, Florida. It is part of the Florida College System and one of several institutions in that system designated a "state college" as it offers a greater number of four-year bachelor's degrees than traditional community colleges.

The college was established in 1966 as Florida Junior College. It has four major physical campuses and several additional centers located around the First Coast region and currently enrolls 52,000 students.

History
The institution was founded in 1966 as Florida Junior College. With the growth of the community college movement, it was renamed Florida Community College at Jacksonville (FCCJ) in 1986.

In 2009, in recognition of a shortage of four-year colleges in the state, the Florida Legislature passed legislation creating the Florida College System, enabling some community colleges to become "state colleges", meaning they can offer more bachelor's degrees than traditional community colleges, but no graduate degree programs. FCCJ was one of the first community colleges to make the change, and, also in 2009, announced the change to their current name, "Florida State College at Jacksonville".

Campuses

Downtown Campus
Florida State College at Jacksonville's main administrative campus is situated in Downtown Jacksonville adjacent to the historic neighborhood of Springfield. Established in 1977, Its programs focus on college degrees, continuing education and vocational training. The Downtown Campus places particular emphasis on educational outreach; programs of focus include building construction, auto mechanic, electrical and metal trades, and English as a second language. The campus is situated north of State Street and south of First Street between Main and Jefferson streets. Nearby Rosa Parks Transit Station offers both bus and Jacksonville Skyway monorail service.

Other downtown facilities include:
The Administrative Offices serve the administrative functions of FSCJ, and are located adjacent to the Downtown Campus.
The Advanced Technology Center is a specialized facility for teaching technical topics such as information technology, industrial electricity, transportation technology, biotechnology, and corporate training. The ATC is located along State Street west of Downtown Campus and behind the Administrative Offices.
The Urban Resource Center is home to the Open Campus as well as FSCJ's military and government programs. It is located on State Street near the Downtown Campus. Open Campus is FSCJ's virtual school. It offers accredited college courses through online distance learning. It is housed in the Downtown Campus' Urban Resource Center.

North Campus
North Campus is located off Dunn Avenue on Jacksonville's Northside. Built in 1970, it houses many of FSCJ's health programs, including nursing, dental hygiene, and emergency medical services. North Campus also includes the Culinary Institute of the South, a culinary school with its own restaurant, and a cosmetology program. The North Campus includes baseball, softball, and soccer facilities.

Kent Campus
Kent Campus is located on Roosevelt Boulevard in the Riverside and Avondale neighborhood. It opened in 1966 using over 100 World War II-era housing units as classrooms. Originally known as Cumberland Campus, it was later renamed after Fred H. Kent, a prominent Jacksonville attorney, and the first Chairman of the FSCJ District Board of Trustees. In 1979, the buildings that were still structurally sound went into service as residential housing in the community.  Kent Campus was rebuilt in an all-brick, closed courtyard design, gaining it a reputation over the years as an aesthetically pleasing area in an urban environment.

South Campus
South Campus is located on Beach Boulevard on Jacksonville's Southside. Its programs focus on technical and liberal arts associate's degrees. South Campus is home to FSCJ's art, music and theater programs and the Nathan H. Wilson Center for the Arts, as well as the Jacksonville Regional Fire/Rescue Training and Education Center. The campus features the Sports Center, an arena for basketball, volleyball, and tennis.

Other facilities 
The Betty P. Cook Nassau Center, located in Yulee, is an outlying FSCJ branch serving Nassau County residents. It offers courses and certificate and degree programs in various fields. Nassau Center includes the Outdoor Education Center, a 16-acre natural space owned by the college. It houses the Nassau County Yulee Library Branch.
Cecil Center North is located at Cecil Commerce Center on Jacksonville's Westside. It offers more traditional college courses than the nearby Cecil Center South.
Cecil Center – Aviation Programs is located at Cecil Field, near Cecil Center. Its programs focus on aviation and related fields, including pilot training, aviation operations, and aviation maintenance.
Deerwood Center is situated in a former shopping mall in the Baymeadows area of Jacksonville's Southside. It offers a variety of courses and programs. It is also the center of FSCJ's information technology department, which maintains the college's computer network and serves distance learners.

Athletics
FSCJ offers intercollegiate athletics for both men and women. The FSCJ Athletic Program competes in Men's and Women's Cross-Country, Women's Volleyball, Women's Fast-Pitch Softball, Women's Tennis, Men's Basketball and Men's Baseball.  The college competes as a Division 1 program in the Mid-Florida Conference of the Florida State College Activities Association (FSCAA) in the Mid-Florida Conference. The FSCAA is governed by the rules of the National Junior Community College Athletic Association (NJCAA), of which FSCJ is a member of Region 8.

FSCJ had a track and field program that was dismantled due to Title IX and lack of community college teams to compete against at the completion of the 2000 outdoor track season. Larry Monts served as its only head coach, coaching 129 NJCAA All-Americans, 29 national champions, and winning two team NJCAA National Championship during his tenure.

In 2017 FSCJ hired former assistant coach and Jacksonville native Jody Hale to restart the Cross-Country program.

Notable alumni
 Janet H. Adkins, member of the Florida House of Representatives
 Audrey Gibson, member of the Florida House of Representatives
 Alvin Heggs, professional basketball player
 Sam Jones, mayor of Mobile, Alabama
 Tim McGraw, country music artist and actor (attended for one semester)
 Michael D. Reynolds, astronomer and faculty member at Florida State College at Jacksonville
 Kevin O'Sullivan, head baseball coach for the Florida Gators
 Kelly Kelly, former WWE professional wrestler and 1x Divas Champion

References

External links

 

 
Florida College System
Universities and colleges in Jacksonville, Florida
Universities and colleges accredited by the Southern Association of Colleges and Schools
Educational institutions established in 1966
1966 establishments in Florida
Universities and colleges in the Jacksonville metropolitan area
Laura Street